This was the first edition of this event.

Zhu Lin won the title, defeating Ankita Raina in the final, 6–3, 3–6, 6–4.

Seeds

Draw

Finals

Top half

Bottom half

References
Main Draw

Jin'an Open - Singles
Jin'an Open